4-Keto-PCP is a recreational designer drug from the arylcyclohexylamine family, with dissociative effects. It has potency in between that of ketamine and phencyclidine but with somewhat more sedating effects in animal studies.

See also 
 3-HO-PCP
 3-Fluoro-PCP
 Bromadol
 Dimetamine
 Methoxetamine

References 

Arylcyclohexylamines
Designer drugs
Dissociative drugs
1-Piperidinyl compounds